Gary Paul Davis (born September 11, 1968), better known professionally as Litefoot, is an American business professional, actor, musician, and a citizen of the Cherokee Nation. He is the Executive Director of the Native American Financial Services Association (NAFSA), CEO of Davis Strategy Group and a member of the Forbes Finance Council. As an actor, he is known for his roles as Little Bear in the movie The Indian in the Cupboard, and Nightwolf in Mortal Kombat Annihilation.

Early and personal life
Litefoot was born in Upland, California, was raised in Tulsa, Oklahoma, and has lived in Seattle, Washington since 1997. He is of Cherokee descent on his father's side and of Chichimeca (northern Mexican indigenous) descent on his mother's side. He is married to Carmen Davis, who serves as president of the Reach The Rez effort and is of the Makah, Yakama, and Chippewa Cree tribes. They have three sons, Quannah, Sequoyah, and Qwnuseia.

Career

Business
Before being appointed as Executive Director of NAFSA, Davis served as President and CEO of the National Center for American Indian Enterprise Development (NCAIED) and as a member of the NCAIED’s Board of Directors. He has served as Vice-President of Native Affairs for the Triple Five Group, owners of the world’s largest retail shopping malls; the Mall of America and the West Edmonton Mall and he previously served as co-chair of the National Indian Gaming Association’s, American Indian Business Network.

Davis owns and operates the Davis Strategy Group and has facilitated an array of cross sector business opportunities in Indian Country ranging from energy, acquisitions, casino gaming, hospitality, land development, health and pharmaceutical initiatives. He also owns the Native Style Clothing brand and Red Vinyl Records.

Entertainment
Davis is a successful musician and feature film and television actor with eight award winning albums and starring roles in such films as The Indian in The Cupboard (in which he played the title character) and television programs such as House of Cards. Although Litefoot is not the first Native American performer of hip hop music, he is among the first Native American hip hop artists to be an enrolled member of a federally recognized tribe.  He has won six Native American Music Awards, his most recent for Artist of The Year.

Since 2005, he has hosted and produced his own nationally-distributed hip hop and R&B radio show called Reach the Rez Radio, which broadcasts weekly through Native Voice One Satellite Network. Litefoot produces several clothing lines the best known being the "Native Style" brand. He annually spends months of his time working on various reservations across the United States and Canada. His most recent music and speaking tour was the "Reach the Rez Tour". This annual project lasted one year, 54,000 miles and 211 events across the United States.

Philanthropy
Davis has traveled throughout the United States delivering messages of hope and empowerment to over 450 American Indian communities. As the spokesperson of the "Reach The Rez Project", Davis has raised nearly $1.5 million to ensure the success of the effort.

Public speaking
Davis regularly delivers motivational speeches to tribal, educational and corporate audiences as a public speaker. He has provided keynotes and business trainings for corporations and tribes and lectured at a variety of colleges and universities across North America.

Awards and recognition
Davis is a recipient of the prestigious Sevenstar Award from the Cherokee Nation Historical Society, presented to a Cherokee who is accomplished in a chosen field, brought honor to the Cherokee people and serves as an inspiration to others. He has also received the Department of Commerce Minority Business Development Agency National Director Special Recognition Award  was appointed as an Ambassador of the Department of Energy’s, Minorities in Energy initiative and was also appointed to the United States Small Business Administration’s Council on Underserved Communities. Mr. Davis was recognized as one of the "Fifty Faces of Indian Country" by Indian Country Today Media Network.

Discography
 1992 - The Money EP
 1994 - Seein' Red
 1996 - Good Day To Die
 1998 - The Clown Kutz
 1998 - The Life & Times 
 1998 - Red Ryders Vol. 1
 1999 - Red Ryders Vol. 2
 1999 - Rez Affiliated
 1999 - The Lite Years 1989–1999 - The Best of Mr. Foot
 2001 - Tribal Boogie
 2002 - The Messenger
 2003 - Native American Me
 2004 - Redvolution
 2008 - Relentless Pursuit

Filmography
 1995 - The Indian in the Cupboard - Little Bear
 1995 - Showbiz Today - episode - July 13-1995 - Himself
 1997 - The Song of Hiawatha
 1997 - Mortal Kombat Annihilation - Nightwolf
 1997 - Kull the Conqueror - Ascalante
 1998 - Angel on Fire
 2001 - The Pearl - Juan Tomas
 2002 - Adaptation - Russell

References

External links

 Official website
 Litefoot at MySpace
 Official website of the Reach The Rez Project featuring Litefoot
 Official website of Reach the Rez Radio

Video
 Arizona TV news story about Reach the Rez Tour

1968 births
Living people
Male actors from California
Rappers from California
20th-century American male actors
20th-century Native Americans
American musicians of Mexican descent
Musicians from Tulsa, Oklahoma
American radio personalities
People from Upland, California
Rappers from Seattle
Cherokee Nation artists
Hispanic and Latino American male actors
Hispanic and Latino American rappers
Native American male actors
Native American rappers
Native American actors
21st-century American male actors
21st-century American rappers
21st-century Native Americans
American male actors of Mexican descent